Copyright symbol, or copyright sign, is the international symbol of copyright represented by ©.

The copyright symbol © may also refer to:

Copyright (band) (formerly ©), a Canadian muskkaic band
Copyright (or ©), a 2010 album by Finnish hip hop band Teflon Brothers

See also
 (C) (disambiguation)
 Circle-c (disambiguation)
 Registered trademark symbol
 Trademark symbol
 Copyright